This is a list of the bird species recorded in Gibraltar. The avifauna of Gibraltar include a total of 329 species, of which 2 have been introduced by humans. The majority of the introduced species are wanderers from introduced populations in Spain.

This list's taxonomic treatment (designation and sequence of orders, families and species) and nomenclature (common and scientific names) follow the conventions of The Clements Checklist of Birds of the World, 2022 edition with a few changes to match the list of the Gibraltar Ornithological & Natural History Society. The family accounts at the beginning of each heading reflect the Clements' taxonomy, as do the species counts found in each family account. Introduced and accidental species are included in the total counts for Gibraltar.

The following tags have been used to highlight categories. The commonly occurring native species do not fall into any of these categories.

 (A) Accidental – a species that rarely or accidentally occurs in Gibraltar
 (I) Introduced – a species which occurs in Gibraltar as a consequence, direct or indirect, of human actions
 (Ext) Extirpated – a species which no longer occurs in Gibraltar, but other populations still exist elsewhere

Ducks, geese, and waterfowl
Order: AnseriformesFamily: Anatidae

The family Anatidae includes the ducks and most duck-like waterfowl, such as geese and swans. These are birds adapted to an aquatic existence with webbed feet, flattened bills, and feathers that are excellent at shedding water due to an oily coating.

Graylag goose, Anser anser (A)
Common shelduck, Tadorna tadorna (A)
Garganey, Spatula querquedula (A)
Gadwall, Mareca strepera (A)
Eurasian wigeon, Mareca penelope (A)
Mallard, Anas platyrhynchos (A)
Northern pintail, Anas acuta (A)
Green-winged teal, Anas crecca (A)
Tufted duck, Aythya fuligula (A)
Greater scaup, Aythya marila (A)
Common eider, Somateria mollissima (A)
Common scoter, Melanitta nigra (A)
Red-breasted merganser, Mergus serrator (A)

Pheasants, grouse, and allies

Order: GalliformesFamily: Phasianidae

The Phasianidae are a family of terrestrial birds. In general, they are plump (although they vary in size) and have broad, relatively short wings.

Ring-necked pheasant, Phasianus colchicus (A)
Common quail, Coturnix coturnix (A)
Barbary partridge, Alectoris barbara
Red-legged partridge, Alectoris rufa

Flamingos

Order: PhoenicopteriformesFamily: Phoenicopteridae

Flamingos filter-feed on shellfish and algae. Their oddly shaped beaks are specially adapted to separate mud and silt from the food they consume and, uniquely, are used upside-down.

Greater flamingo, Phoenicopterus roseus (A)

Grebes

Order: PodicipediformesFamily: Podicipedidae

Grebes are small to medium-large freshwater diving birds. They have lobed toes and are excellent swimmers and divers. However, they have their feet placed far back on the body, making them quite ungainly on land.

Little grebe, Tachybaptus ruficollis (A)
Great crested grebe, Podiceps cristatus 
Eared grebe, Podiceps nigricollis (A)

Pigeons and doves

Order: ColumbiformesFamily: Columbidae

Pigeons and doves are stout-bodied birds with short necks and short slender bills with a fleshy cere.

Rock pigeon, Columba livia (I)
Stock dove, Columba oenas (A)
Common wood-pigeon, Columba palumbus (A)
European turtle-dove, Streptopelia turtur
Eurasian collared-dove, Streptopelia decaocto

Sandgrouse
Order: PterocliformesFamily: Pteroclidae

Sandgrouse have small, pigeon like heads and necks, but sturdy compact bodies. They have long pointed wings and sometimes tails and a fast direct flight. Flocks fly to watering holes at dawn and dusk. Their legs are feathered down to the toes.

Pin-tailed sandgrouse, Pterocles alchata (A)

Bustards
Order: OtidiformesFamily: Otididae

Bustards are large terrestrial birds mainly associated with dry open country and steppes in the Old World. They are omnivorous and nest on the ground. They walk steadily on strong legs and big toes, pecking for food as they go. They have long broad wings with "fingered" wingtips and striking patterns in flight. Many have interesting mating displays.

Great bustard, Otis tarda (A)

Cuckoos

Order: CuculiformesFamily: Cuculidae

The family Cuculidae includes cuckoos, roadrunners and anis. These are birds of variable sizes with slender bodies, long tails and strong legs.

Great spotted cuckoo, Clamator glandarius (A)
Common cuckoo, Cuculus canorus (A)

Nightjars and allies

Order: CaprimulgiformesFamily: Caprimulgidae

Nightjars are medium-sized nocturnal birds that usually nest on the ground. They have long wings, short legs and very short bills. Most have small feet, of little use for walking, and long pointed wings. Their soft plumage is camouflaged to resemble bark or leaves.

Red-necked nightjar, Caprimulgus ruficollis
Eurasian nightjar, Caprimulgus europaeus (A)

Swifts

Order: CaprimulgiformesFamily: Apodidae

Swifts are small birds which spend the majority of their lives flying. These birds have very short legs and never settle voluntarily on the ground, perching instead only on vertical surfaces. Many swifts have long swept-back wings which resemble a crescent or boomerang.

Alpine swift, Apus melba
Common swift, Apus apus
Pallid swift, Apus pallidus
Little swift, Apus affinis (A)
White-rumped swift, Apus caffer (A)

Rails, gallinules, and coots
Order: GruiformesFamily: Rallidae

Rallidae is a large family of small to medium-sized birds which include the rails, crakes, coots and gallinules. Typically they inhabit dense vegetation in damp environments near lakes, swamps or rivers. In general they are shy and secretive birds, making them difficult to observe. Most species have strong legs and long toes which are well adapted to soft uneven surfaces. They tend to have short, rounded wings and to be weak fliers.

Water rail, Rallus aquaticus 
Eurasian moorhen, Gallinula chloropus (A)
Eurasian coot, Fulica atra (Ex)
Allen's gallinule, Porphyrio alleni (A)
Western swamphen, Porphyrio porphyrio (A)
Baillon's crake, Zapornia pusilla (A)

Cranes

Order: GruiformesFamily: Gruidae

Cranes are large, long-legged and long-necked birds. Unlike the similar-looking but unrelated herons, cranes fly with necks outstretched, not pulled back. Most have elaborate and noisy courting displays or "dances".

Common crane, Grus grus (A)

Thick-knees

Order: CharadriiformesFamily: Burhinidae

The thick-knees are a group of largely tropical waders in the family Burhinidae. They are found worldwide within the tropical zone, with some species also breeding in temperate Europe and Australia. They are medium to large waders with strong black or yellow-black bills, large yellow eyes and cryptic plumage. Despite being classed as waders, most species have a preference for arid or semi-arid habitats.

Eurasian thick-knee, Burhinus oedicnemus (A)

Stilts and avocets
Order: CharadriiformesFamily: Recurvirostridae

Recurvirostridae is a family of large wading birds, which includes the avocets and stilts. The avocets have long legs and long up-curved bills. The stilts have extremely long legs and long, thin, straight bills.

Black-winged stilt, Himantopus himantopus (A)
Pied avocet, Recurvirostra avosetta (A)

Oystercatchers

Order: CharadriiformesFamily: Haematopodidae

The oystercatchers are large and noisy plover-like birds, with strong bills used for smashing or prising open molluscs.

Eurasian oystercatcher, Haematopus ostralegus (A)

Plovers and lapwings

Order: CharadriiformesFamily: Charadriidae

The family Charadriidae includes the plovers, dotterels and lapwings. They are small to medium-sized birds with compact bodies, short, thick necks and long, usually pointed, wings. They are found in open country worldwide, mostly in habitats near water.

Black-bellied plover, Pluvialis squatarola (A)
European golden-plover, Pluvialis apricaria (A)
Northern lapwing, Vanellus vanellus
Kentish plover, Charadrius alexandrinus (A)
Common ringed plover, Charadrius hiaticula (A)

Sandpipers and allies

Order: CharadriiformesFamily: Scolopacidae

Scolopacidae is a large diverse family of small to medium-sized shorebirds including the sandpipers, curlews, godwits, shanks, tattlers, woodcocks, snipes, dowitchers and phalaropes. The majority of these species eat small invertebrates picked out of the mud or soil. Variation in length of legs and bills enables multiple species to feed in the same habitat, particularly on the coast, without direct competition for food.

Whimbrel, Numenius phaeopus (A)
Eurasian curlew, Numenius arquata (A)
Bar-tailed godwit, Limosa lapponica (A)
Black-tailed godwit, Limosa limosa (A)
Ruddy turnstone, Arenaria interpres
Red knot, Calidris canutus (A)
Curlew sandpiper, Calidris ferruginea (A)
Sanderling, Calidris alba (A)
Dunlin, Calidris alpina (A)
Purple sandpiper, Calidris maritima (A)
Little stint, Calidris minuta (A)
Jack snipe, Lymnocryptes minimus (A)
Eurasian woodcock, Scolopax rusticola (A)
Common snipe, Gallinago gallinago (A)
Red-necked phalarope, Phalaropus lobatus (A)
Red phalarope, Phalaropus fulicarius (A)
Common sandpiper, Actitis hypoleucos
Green sandpiper, Tringa ochropus (A)
Common redshank, Tringa totanus (A)

Pratincoles and coursers
Order: CharadriiformesFamily: Glareolidae

Glareolidae is a family of wading birds comprising the pratincoles, which have short legs, long pointed wings and long forked tails, and the coursers, which have long legs, short wings and long, pointed bills which curve downwards.

Collared pratincole, Glareola pratincola (A)

Skuas and jaegers

Order: CharadriiformesFamily: Stercorariidae

Stercorariidae are, in general, medium to large birds, typically with grey or brown plumage, often with white markings on the wings. They nest on the ground in temperate and arctic regions and are long-distance migrants.

Great skua, Stercorarius skua
Pomarine jaeger, Stercorarius pomarinus (A)
Parasitic jaeger, Stercorarius parasiticus

Auks, murres, and puffins

Order: CharadriiformesFamily: Alcidae

Alcids are superficially similar to penguins due to their black-and-white colours, their upright posture and some of their habits, however they are not related to the penguins and differ in being able to fly. Auks live on the open sea, only deliberately coming ashore to nest.

Common murre, Uria aalge (A)
Razorbill, Alca torda
Atlantic puffin, Fratercula arctica

Gulls, terns, and skimmers

Order: CharadriiformesFamily: Laridae

Laridae is a family of medium to large seabirds that includes gulls, terns, and skimmers. Gulls are typically grey or white, often with black markings on the head or wings. They have stout, longish bills and webbed feet. Terns are a group of generally medium to large seabirds typically with grey or white plumage, often with black markings on the head. Most terns hunt fish by diving but some pick insects off the surface of fresh water. Terns are generally long-lived birds, with several species known to live in excess of 30 years.

Black-legged kittiwake, Rissa tridactyla
Sabine's gull, Xema sabini (A)
Slender-billed gull, Chroicocephalus genei (A)
Gray-hooded gull, Chroicocephalus cirrocephalus (A)
Black-headed gull, Chroicocephalus ridibundus
Little gull, Hydrocoloeus minutus
Laughing gull, Leucophaeus atricilla (A)
Mediterranean gull, Ichthyaetus melanocephalus
Audouin's gull, Ichthyaetus audouinii
Common gull, Larus canus (A)
Ring-billed gull, Larus delawarensis (A)
Herring gull, Larus argentatus (A)
Yellow-legged gull, Larus michahellis
Caspian gull, Larus cachinnans (A)
Iceland gull, Larus glaucoides (A)
Lesser black-backed gull, Larus fuscus
Great black-backed gull, Larus marinus (A)
Little tern, Sternula albifrons (A)
Gull-billed tern, Gelochelidon nilotica (A)
Caspian tern, Hydroprogne caspia (A)
Black tern, Chlidonias niger
White-winged tern, Chlidonias leucopterus (A)
Whiskered tern, Chlidonias hybrida (A)
Roseate tern, Sterna dougallii (A)
Common tern, Sterna hirundo
Arctic tern, Sterna paradisaea (A)
Sandwich tern, Thalasseus sandvicensis
Lesser crested tern, Thalasseus bengalensis (A)
West African crested tern, Thalasseus albididorsalis (A)

Loons
Order: GaviiformesFamily: Gaviidae

Divers, known as loons in North America, are a group of aquatic birds found in many parts of North America and northern Europe. They are the size of a large duck or small goose, but to which they are completely unrelated.

Red-throated loon, Gavia stellata (A)
Arctic loon, Gavia arctica (A)
Common loon, Gavia immer (A)

Northern storm-petrels

Order: ProcellariiformesFamily: Hydrobatidae

The northern storm-petrels are relatives of the petrels and are the smallest seabirds. They feed on planktonic crustaceans and small fish picked from the surface, typically while hovering. The flight is fluttering and sometimes bat-like.

European storm-petrel, Hydrobates pelagicus
Leach's storm-petrel, Hydrobates leucorhous

Shearwaters and petrels

Order: ProcellariiformesFamily: Procellariidae

The procellariids are the main group of medium-sized "true petrels", characterised by united nostrils with medium septum and a long outer functional primary.

Cape petrel, Daption capense (A)
Cory's shearwater, Calonectris borealis
Great shearwater, Ardenna gravis (A)
Sooty shearwater, Ardenna griseus (A)
Yelkouan shearwater, Puffinus yelkouan
Balearic shearwater, Puffinus mauretanicus
Barolo shearwater, Puffinus baroli (A)

Storks

Order: CiconiiformesFamily: Ciconiidae

Storks are large, long-legged, long-necked, wading birds with long stout bills. Storks are mute, but bill-clattering is an important mode of communication at the nest. Their nests can be large and may be reused for many years. Many species are migratory.

Black stork, Ciconia nigra
White stork, Ciconia ciconia

Boobies and gannets

Order: SuliformesFamily: Sulidae

The sulids comprise the gannets and boobies. Both are medium to large coastal seabirds that plunge-dive for fish..

Brown booby, Sula leucogaster (A)
Northern gannet, Morus bassanus

Cormorants and shags

Order: SuliformesFamily: Phalacrocoracidae

Phalacrocoracidae is a family of medium to large coastal, fish-eating seabirds that includes cormorants and shags. Colouration varies, with the majority having mainly dark plumage, some species being black-and-white and a few being colourful.

Great cormorant, Phalacrocorax carbo
European shag, Gulosus aristotelis

Herons, egrets, and bitterns
Order: PelecaniformesFamily: Ardeidae

The family Ardeidae contains the bitterns, herons, and egrets. Herons and egrets are medium to large wading birds with long necks and legs. Bitterns tend to have shorter necks and be more wary. Members of Ardeidae fly with their necks retracted, unlike other long-necked birds such as storks, ibises and spoonbills.

Little bittern, Ixobrychus minutus (A)
Gray heron, Ardea cinerea (A)
Purple heron, Ardea purpurea (A)
Little egret, Egretta garzetta (A)
Cattle egret, Bubulcus ibis (A)
Squacco heron, Ardeola ralloides (A)
Black-crowned night-heron, Nycticorax nycticorax (A)

Ibises and spoonbills
Order: PelecaniformesFamily: Threskiornithidae

Threskiornithidae is a family of large terrestrial and wading birds which includes the ibises and spoonbills. They have long, broad wings with 11 primary and about 20 secondary feathers. They are strong fliers and despite their size and weight, very capable soarers.

Glossy ibis, Plegadis falcinellus (A)
Eurasian spoonbill, Platalea leucorodia (A)

Osprey

Order: AccipitriformesFamily: Pandionidae

The family Pandionidae contains only one species, the osprey. The osprey is a medium-large raptor which is a specialist fish-eater with a worldwide distribution.

Osprey, Pandion haliaetus

Hawks, eagles, and kites

Order: AccipitriformesFamily: Accipitridae

Accipitridae is a family of birds of prey, which includes hawks, eagles, kites, harriers and Old World vultures. These birds have powerful hooked beaks for tearing flesh from their prey, strong legs, powerful talons and keen eyesight.

Black-winged kite, Elanus caeruleus (A)
Bearded vulture, Gypaetus barbatus (A)
Egyptian vulture, Neophron percnopterus
European honey-buzzard, Pernis apivorus
Cinereous vulture, Aegypius monachus (A)
Rüppell's griffon, Gyps ruepelli (A)
Eurasian griffon, Gyps fulvus
Short-toed snake-eagle, Circaetus gallicus
Lesser spotted eagle, Clanga pomarina (A)
Greater spotted eagle, Clanga clanga (A)
Booted eagle, Hieraaetus pennatus
Steppe eagle, Aquila nipalensis (A)
Spanish eagle, Aquila adalberti (A)
Golden eagle, Aquila chrysaetos (A)
Bonelli's eagle, Aquila fasciata (A)
Eurasian marsh-harrier, Circus aeruginosus
Hen harrier, Circus cyaneus (A)
Pallid harrier, Circus macrourus (A)
Montagu's harrier, Circus pygargus
Eurasian sparrowhawk, Accipiter nisus
Northern goshawk, Accipiter gentilis (A)
Red kite, Milvus milvus (A)
Black kite, Milvus migrans
Common buzzard, Buteo buteo (A)
Long-legged buzzard, Buteo rufinus (A)

Barn-owls
Order: StrigiformesFamily: Tytonidae

Barn-owls are medium to large owls with large heads and characteristic heart-shaped faces. They have long strong legs with powerful talons.

Barn owl, Tyto alba

Owls

Order: StrigiformesFamily: Strigidae

The typical owls are small to large solitary nocturnal birds of prey. They have large forward-facing eyes and ears, a hawk-like beak and a conspicuous circle of feathers around each eye called a facial disk.

Eurasian scops-owl, Otus scops
Eurasian eagle-owl, Bubo bubo
Little owl, Athene noctua
Tawny owl, Strix aluco
Long-eared owl, Asio otus (A)
Short-eared owl, Asio flammeus (A)

Hoopoes

Order: BucerotiformesFamily: Upupidae

Hoopoes have black, white and orangey-pink colouring with a large erectile crest on their head.

Eurasian hoopoe, Upupa epops

Kingfishers
Order: CoraciiformesFamily: Alcedinidae

Kingfishers are medium-sized birds with large heads, long, pointed bills, short legs and stubby tails.

Common kingfisher, Alcedo atthis

Bee-eaters

Order: CoraciiformesFamily: Meropidae

The bee-eaters are a group of near passerine birds in the family Meropidae. Most species are found in Africa but others occur in southern Europe, Madagascar, Australia and New Guinea. They are characterised by richly coloured plumage, slender bodies and usually elongated central tail feathers. All are colourful and have long downturned bills and pointed wings, which give them a swallow-like appearance when seen from afar.

Blue-cheeked bee-eater, Merops persicus (A)
European bee-eater, Merops apiaster

Rollers
Order: CoraciiformesFamily: Coraciidae

Rollers resemble crows in size and build, but are more closely related to the kingfishers and bee-eaters. They share the colourful appearance of those groups with blues and browns predominating. The two inner front toes are connected, but the outer toe is not.

European roller, Coracias garrulus (A)

Woodpeckers
Order: PiciformesFamily: Picidae

Woodpeckers are small to medium-sized birds with chisel-like beaks, short legs, stiff tails and long tongues used for capturing insects. Some species have feet with two toes pointing forward and two backward, while several species have only three toes. Many woodpeckers have the habit of tapping noisily on tree trunks with their beaks.

Eurasian wryneck, Jynx torquilla
Great spotted woodpecker, Dendrocopos major (A)
Iberian green woodpecker, Picus sharpei (A)

Falcons and caracaras

Order: FalconiformesFamily: Falconidae

Falconidae is a family of diurnal birds of prey. They differ from hawks, eagles and kites in that they kill with their beaks instead of their talons.

Lesser kestrel, Falco naumanni
Eurasian kestrel, Falco tinnunculus
Red-footed falcon, Falco vespertinus (A)
Eleonora's falcon, Falco eleonorae
Merlin, Falco columbarius (A)
Eurasian hobby, Falco subbuteo
Lanner falcon, Falco biarmicus (A)
Saker falcon, Falco cherrug (A)
Peregrine falcon, Falco peregrinus

Old World parrots
Order: PsittaciformesFamily: Psittaculidae

Characteristic features of parrots include a strong curved bill, an upright stance, strong legs, and clawed zygodactyl feet. Many parrots are vividly colored, and some are multi-colored. Old World parrots are found from Africa east across south and southeast Asia and Oceania to Australia and New Zealand.

Rose-ringed parakeet, Psittacula krameri (I)

Old World orioles

Order: PasseriformesFamily: Oriolidae

The Old World orioles are colourful passerine birds. They are not related to the New World orioles.

Eurasian golden oriole, Oriolus oriolus (A)

Shrikes
Order: PasseriformesFamily: Laniidae

Shrikes are passerine birds known for their habit of catching other birds and small animals and impaling the uneaten portions of their bodies on thorns. A typical shrike's beak is hooked, like a bird of prey.

Red-backed shrike, Lanius collurio (A)
Great gray shrike, Lanius excubitor (A)
Masked shrike, Lanius nubicus (A)
Woodchat shrike, Lanius senator

Crows, jays, and magpies

Order: PasseriformesFamily: Corvidae

The family Corvidae includes crows, ravens, jays, choughs, magpies, treepies, nutcrackers and ground jays. Corvids are above average in size among the Passeriformes, and some of the larger species show high levels of intelligence.

Eurasian jay, Garrulus glandarius (A)
Iberian magpie, Cyanopica cooki (A)
Eurasian magpie, Pica pica (A)
Red-billed chough, Pyrrhocorax pyrrhocorax (A)
Yellow-billed chough, Pyrrhocorax graculus (A)
Eurasian jackdaw, Corvus monedula
House crow, Corvus splendens (A)
Carrion crow, Corvus corone (A)
Hooded crow, Corvus cornix (A)
Pied crow, Corvus albus (A)
Common raven, Corvus corax

Tits, chickadees, and titmice

Order: PasseriformesFamily: Paridae

The Paridae are mainly small stocky woodland species with short stout bills. Some have crests. They are adaptable birds, eating a mixed diet including seeds and insects.

Coal tit, Periparus ater (A)
Crested tit, Lophophanes cristatus (A)
Eurasian blue tit, Cyanistes caeruleus
Great tit, Parus major

Penduline-tits
Order: PasseriformesFamily: Remizidae

The penduline-tits are a group of small passerine birds related to the true tits. They are insectivores.

Eurasian penduline-tit, Remiz pendulinus

Larks

Order: PasseriformesFamily: Alaudidae

Larks are small terrestrial birds with often extravagant songs and display flights. Most larks are fairly dull in appearance. Their food is insects and seeds.

Greater short-toed lark, Calandrella brachydactyla
Calandra lark, Melanocorypha calandra (A)
Wood lark, Lullula arborea (A)
Eurasian skylark, Alauda arvensis
Thekla lark, Galerida theklae
Crested lark, Galerida cristata (A)

Cisticolas and allies

Order: PasseriformesFamily: Cisticolidae

The Cisticolidae are warblers found mainly in warmer southern regions of the Old World. They are generally very small birds of drab brown or grey appearance found in open country such as grassland or scrub.

Zitting cisticola, Cisticola juncidis

Reed warblers and allies
Order: PasseriformesFamily: Acrocephalidae

The members of this family are usually rather large for "warblers". Most are rather plain olivaceous brown above with much yellow to beige below. They are usually found in open woodland, reedbeds, or tall grass. The family occurs mostly in southern to western Eurasia and surroundings, but it also ranges far into the Pacific, with some species in Africa.

Eastern olivaceous warbler, Iduna pallida (A)
Western olivaceous warbler, Iduna opaca
Melodious warbler, Hippolais polyglotta
Icterine warbler, Hippolais icterina (A)
Moustached warbler, Acrocephalus melanopogon (A)
Sedge warbler, Acrocephalus schoenobaenus (A)
Blyth's reed warbler, Acrocephalus dumetorum (A)
Common reed warbler, Acrocephalus scirpaceus
Great reed warbler, Acrocephalus arundinaceus (A)

Grassbirds and allies 
Order: PasseriformesFamily: Locustellidae

Locustellidae are a family of small insectivorous songbirds found mainly in Eurasia, Africa, and the Australian region. They are smallish birds with tails that are usually long and pointed, and tend to be drab brownish or buffy all over.

Savi's warbler, Locustella luscinioides (A)
Common grasshopper-warbler, Locustella naevia (A)

Swallows

Order: PasseriformesFamily: Hirundinidae

The family Hirundinidae is adapted to aerial feeding. They have a slender streamlined body, long pointed wings and a short bill with a wide gape. Their feet are designed for perching rather than walking, and the front toes are partially joined at the base.

Bank swallow, Riparia riparia
Eurasian crag-martin, Ptyonoprogne rupestris
Barn swallow, Hirundo rustica
Red-rumped swallow, Cecropis daurica
Common house-martin, Delichon urbicum

Leaf warblers
Order: PasseriformesFamily: Phylloscopidae

Leaf warblers are a family of small insectivorous birds found mostly in Eurasia and ranging into Wallacea and Africa. The species are of various sizes, often green-plumaged above and yellow below, or more subdued with grayish-green to grayish-brown colors.

Wood warbler, Phylloscopus sibilatrix (A)
Western Bonelli's warbler, Phylloscopus bonelli
Yellow-browed warbler, Phylloscopus inornatus (A)
Pallas's warbler, Phylloscopus proregulus (A)
Dusky warbler, Phylloscopus fuscatus (A)
Willow warbler, Phylloscopus trochilus
Mountain chiffchaff, Phylloscopus sindianus (A)
Common chiffchaff, Phylloscopus collybita
Iberian chiffchaff, Phylloscopus ibericus
Arctic warbler, Phylloscopus borealis (A)

Bush warblers and allies
Order: PasseriformesFamily: Scotocercidae

The members of this family are found throughout Africa, Asia, and Polynesia. Their taxonomy is in flux, and some authorities place some genera in other families.

Cetti's warbler, Cettia cetti (A)

Long-tailed tits
Order: PasseriformesFamily: Aegithalidae

The long-tailed tits are a group of small passerine birds with medium to long tails. They make woven bag nests in trees. Most eat a mixed diet which includes insects.

Long-tailed tit, Aegithalos caudatus (A)

Sylviid warblers, parrotbills, and allies

Order: PasseriformesFamily: Sylviidae

The family Sylviidae is a group of small insectivorous passerine birds. They mainly occur as breeding species, as the common name implies, in Europe, Asia and, to a lesser extent, Africa. Most have generally undistinguished appearance, but many have distinctive songs.

Eurasian blackcap, Sylvia atricapilla
Garden warbler, Sylvia borin
Lesser whitethroat, Curruca curruca (A)
Western Orphean warbler, Curruca hortensis
Tristram's warbler, Curruca deserticola (A)
Sardinian warbler, Curruca melanocephala
Western subalpine warbler, Curruca iberiae
Eastern subalpine warbler, Curruca cantillans (A)
Greater whitethroat, Curruca communis
Spectacled warbler, Curruca conspicillata
Marmora's warbler, Curruca sarda (A)
Dartford warbler, Curruca undata

Kinglets
Order: PasseriformesFamily: Regulidae

The kinglets, also called crests, are a small group of birds often included in the Old World warblers, but frequently given family status because they also resemble the titmice.

Goldcrest, Regulus regulus (A)
Common firecrest, Regulus ignicapillus

Wallcreeper
Order: PasseriformesFamily: Tichodromidae

The wallcreeper is a small bird related to the nuthatch family, which has stunning crimson, grey and black plumage.

Wallcreeper, Tichodroma muraria (A)

Treecreepers

Order: PasseriformesFamily: Certhiidae

Treecreepers are small woodland birds, brown above and white below. They have thin pointed down-curved bills, which they use to extricate insects from bark. They have stiff tail feathers, like woodpeckers, which they use to support themselves on vertical trees.

Short-toed treecreeper, Certhia brachydactyla (A)

Wrens

Order: PasseriformesFamily: Troglodytidae

The wrens are mainly small and inconspicuous except for their loud songs. These birds have short wings and thin down-turned bills. Several species often hold their tails upright. All are insectivorous.

Eurasian wren, Troglodytes troglodytes

Starlings

Order: PasseriformesFamily: Sturnidae

Starlings are small to medium-sized passerine birds. Their flight is strong and direct and they are very gregarious. Their preferred habitat is fairly open country. They eat insects and fruit. Plumage is typically dark with a metallic sheen.

European starling, Sturnus vulgaris
Spotless starling, Sturnus unicolor

Thrushes and allies

Order: PasseriformesFamily: Turdidae

The thrushes are a group of passerine birds that occur mainly in the Old World. They are plump, soft plumaged, small to medium-sized insectivores or sometimes omnivores, often feeding on the ground. Many have attractive songs.

Mistle thrush, Turdus viscivorus (A)
Song thrush, Turdus philomelos
Redwing, Turdus iliacus (A)
Eurasian blackbird, Turdus merula
Fieldfare, Turdus pilaris (A)
Ring ouzel, Turdus torquatus (A)

Old World flycatchers

Order: PasseriformesFamily: Muscicapidae

Old World flycatchers and chats are a large group of small passerine birds native to the Old World. They are mainly small arboreal insectivores. The appearance of these birds is highly varied, and they mostly have weak songs and harsh calls.

Spotted flycatcher, Muscicapa striata
Rufous-tailed scrub-robin, Cercotrichas galactotes (A)
European robin, Erithacus rubecula
Common nightingale, Luscinia megarhynchos
Bluethroat, Luscinia svecica (A)
Red-breasted flycatcher, Ficedula parva (A)
European pied flycatcher, Ficedula hypoleuca
Common redstart, Phoenicurus phoenicurus
Black redstart, Phoenicurus ochruros
Rufous-tailed rock-thrush, Monticola saxatilis (A)
Blue rock-thrush, Monticola solitarius
Whinchat, Saxicola rubetra
European stonechat, Saxicola rubicola
Northern wheatear, Oenanthe oenanthe
Desert wheatear, Oenanthe deserti (A)
Western black-eared wheatear, Oenanthe hispanica
Black wheatear, Oenanthe leucura (Ex)

Waxbills and allies
Order: PasseriformesFamily: Estrildidae

The estrildid finches are small passerine birds of the Old World tropics and Australasia. They are gregarious and often colonial seed eaters with short thick but pointed bills. They are all similar in structure and habits, but have a wide variation in plumage colour and pattern.

Common waxbill, Estrilda astrild (A)

Accentors

Order: PasseriformesFamily: Prunellidae

The accentors are in the only bird family, Prunellidae, which is completely endemic to the Palearctic. They are small, fairly drab species superficially similar to sparrows.

Alpine accentor, Prunella collaris (A)
Dunnock, Prunella modularis (A)

Old World sparrows

Order: PasseriformesFamily: Passeridae

Old World sparrows are small passerine birds. In general, sparrows tend to be small, plump, brown or grey birds with short tails and short powerful beaks. Sparrows are seed-eaters, but they also consume small insects.

House sparrow, Passer domesticus
Spanish sparrow, Passer hispaniolensis (A)
Eurasian tree sparrow, Passer montanus (A)
Rock sparrow, Petronia petronia (A)

Wagtails and pipits

Order: PasseriformesFamily: Motacillidae

Motacillidae is a family of small passerine birds with medium to long tails. They include the wagtails, longclaws and pipits. They are slender, ground feeding insectivores of open country.

Gray wagtail, Motacilla cinerea
Western yellow wagtail, Motacilla flava
White wagtail, Motacilla alba
Richard's pipit, Anthus richardi (A)
Tawny pipit, Anthus campestris
Meadow pipit, Anthus pratensis
Tree pipit, Anthus trivialis
Red-throated pipit, Anthus cervinus (A)
Water pipit, Anthus spinoletta (A)
Rock pipit, Anthus petrosus (A)

Finches, euphonias, and allies

Order: PasseriformesFamily: Fringillidae

Finches are seed-eating passerine birds, that are small to moderately large and have a strong beak, usually conical and in some species very large. All have twelve tail feathers and nine primaries. These birds have a bouncing flight with alternating bouts of flapping and gliding on closed wings, and most sing well.

Common chaffinch, Fringilla coelebs
Brambling, Fringilla montifringilla (A)
Hawfinch, Coccothraustes coccothraustes (A)
Common rosefinch, Carpodacus erythrinus (A)
Eurasian bullfinch, Pyrrhula pyrrhula (A)
Trumpeter finch, Bucanetes githaginea (A)
European greenfinch, Chloris chloris
Eurasian linnet, Linaria cannabina
Red crossbill, Loxia curvirostra (A)
European goldfinch, Carduelis carduelis
European serin, Serinus serinus
Eurasian siskin, Spinus spinus

Longspurs and snow buntings
Order: PasseriformesFamily: Calcariidae

The Calcariidae are a family of birds that had been traditionally grouped with the New World sparrows, but differ in a number of respects and are usually found in open grassy areas.

 Snow bunting, Plectrophenax nivalis (A)

Old World buntings

Order: PasseriformesFamily: Emberizidae

The emberizids are a large family of passerine birds. They are seed eaters with distinctively shaped bills.  Many emberizid species have distinctive head patterns.

Corn bunting, Emberiza calandra (A)
Rock bunting, Emberiza cia (A)
Cirl bunting, Emberiza cirlus (A)
Yellowhammer, Emberiza citrinella (A)
Pine bunting, Emberiza leucocephalos (A)
Ortolan bunting, Emberiza hortulana (A)
House bunting, Emberiza sahari (A)
Reed bunting, Emberiza schoeniclus (A)
Little bunting, Emberiza pusilla (A)

New World sparrows
Order: PasseriformesFamily: Passerellidae

The New World sparrows (or American sparrows) are a large family of seed-eating passerine birds with distinctively finch-like bills.

Dark-eyed junco, Junco hyemalis (A)
White-throated sparrow, Zonotrichia albicollis (A)

Troupials and allies
Order: PasseriformesFamily: Icteridae

The icterids are a group of small to medium-sized, often colourful, passerine birds restricted to the New World and include the grackles, New World blackbirds and New World orioles. Most species have black as the predominant plumage colour, often enlivened by yellow, orange or red.

Bobolink, Dolichonyx oryzivorus (A)
Common grackle, Quiscalus quiscula (A)

New World warblers
Order: PasseriformesFamily: Parulidae

The New World warblers are a group of small often colorful passerine birds restricted to the New World. Most are arboreal, but some are more terrestrial. Most members of this family are insectivores.

Yellow-rumped warbler, Setophaga coronata (A)

Cardinals and allies
Order: PasseriformesFamily: Cardinalidae

The cardinals are a family of robust, seed-eating birds with strong bills. They are typically associated with open woodland. The sexes usually have distinct plumage.

Indigo bunting, Passerina cyanea (A)

See also
 List of birds
 Lists of birds by region
 List of mammals of Gibraltar
 List of reptiles and amphibians of Gibraltar

References

External links

The Gibraltar Ornithological & Natural History Society

Gibraltar
Fauna of Gibraltar
Gibraltar
Gibraltar-related lists